Pommereuil (also: Le Pommereuil) is a commune in the Nord department in northern France.

History
The village and surrounding woods (Bois l'Évêque) were heavily damaged by a tornado on 24 June 1967, a relatively rare occurrence in France.

Heraldry

Monuments

 The church, Église Saint-Michel, was built during the 17th Century and has a fortified tower.

See also
Communes of the Nord department

References

Communes of Nord (French department)